Tova Mirvis is an American novelist. She is a graduate of Columbia College of Columbia University and holds an masters of fine arts degree in fiction writing from Columbia University School of the Arts. Mirvis' family has lived in Memphis, Tennessee, since 1874 when her German-born grandmother moved there at age two.

Wendy Shalit essay
Mirvis was the subject of a 2005 essay by Wendy Shalit entitled "The Observant Reader" in The New York Times Book Review which accused Mirvis, an Orthodox Jew, of writing ostensibly "'insider' fiction (that) actually reveals the authors' estrangement from the traditional Orthodox community." Mirvis defended herself in an essay in The Forward.

Writings

Mirvis's published works include:

Books
Novels
 
  
 

Memoir

Shorter works

Essays and other pieces

 
 
  
 

  
 
"Untamed novel, Untamed life," Beyond The Margins

Stories

References

Sources

http://media.www.touroindependent.com/media/storage/paper790/news/2006/01/01/Features/Tova-Mirvis.On.Balance.Motherhood.And.Moving.Beyond.Stereotypes-1308385.shtml

http://www.exclusivebooks.com/interviews/ftf/tova_mirvis.php?PHPSESSID=of70o22c2grqpg9gf7tm74s5n0

External links
 
 

Living people
20th-century American novelists
21st-century American novelists
American women novelists
Jewish American novelists
Writers from Memphis, Tennessee
Writers from Newton, Massachusetts
20th-century American women writers
21st-century American women writers
Columbia University School of the Arts alumni
1972 births
Novelists from Massachusetts
Novelists from Tennessee
Columbia College (New York) alumni
21st-century American Jews